Kentucky Route 390 (KY 390) is a  state highway in the U.S. state of Kentucky. The highway connects mostly rural areas of Washington and Mercer counties with Harrodsburg.

Route description

Washington County
KY 390 begins at an intersection with KY 53 (Lawrenceburg Road) west-southwest of Seaville, in the extreme northeastern part of Washington County. It travels to the north-northeast and curves to the east-southeast. It travels through Seaville and intersects the western terminus of KY 1160 (Talmage–Mayo Road) on the Mercer County line.

Washington–Mercer county line
KY 390 travels along the county line and curves to the southeast. It crosses over Thompson Creek and enters Tablow. There, the highway intersects the western terminus of KY 926 (Bethel Road). The highway then enters Mercer County proper.

Mercer County
KY 390 enters Duncan, where it intersects the northern terminus of KY 1941 (Grapevine Road). It continues to the southeast and intersects the eastern terminus of KY 1623 (Manns Road). It travels through Bohon. It curves to the east-southeast and crosses over the Salt River. It curves to the southeast and crosses over some railroad tracks of Norfolk Southern Railway. The highway curves back to the east-southeast and enters Harrodsburg. It curves to the south-southeast and intersects the northern terminus of both Industry Road and Moberly Road. KY 390 turns left onto Industry Road, to the east-northeast, and leaves the city limits of Harrodsburg. It then curves to the east-southeast and meets its eastern terminus, an intersection with U.S. Route 127 (US 127; North College Street / Louisville Road). Here, the roadway continues as US 127 Byp.

Major intersections

See also

References

0390
Transportation in Washington County, Kentucky
Transportation in Mercer County, Kentucky